Iodised salt (also spelled iodized salt) is table salt mixed with a minute amount of various salts of the element iodine. The ingestion of iodine prevents iodine deficiency. Worldwide, iodine deficiency affects about two billion people and is the leading preventable cause of intellectual and developmental disabilities. Deficiency also causes thyroid gland problems, including endemic goitre. In many countries, iodine deficiency is a major public health problem that can be cheaply addressed by purposely adding small amounts of iodine to the sodium chloride salt.

Iodine is a micronutrient and dietary mineral that is naturally present in the food supply in some regions, especially near sea coasts but is generally quite rare in the Earth's crust since iodine is a so-called heavy element, and abundance of chemical elements generally declines with greater atomic mass. Where natural levels of iodine in the soil are low and the iodine is not taken up by vegetables, iodine added to salt provides the small but essential amount of iodine needed by humans.

An opened package of table salt with iodide may rapidly lose its iodine content in high temperature and high relative humidity conditions through the process of oxidation and iodine sublimation.

Chemistry, biochemistry and nutritional aspects

Four inorganic compounds are used as iodide sources, depending on the producer: potassium iodate, potassium iodide, sodium iodate, and sodium iodide.  Any of these compounds supplies the body with its iodine required for the biosynthesis of thyroxine (T4) and triiodothyronine (T3) hormones by the thyroid gland.  Animals also benefit from iodine supplements, and the hydrogen iodide derivative of ethylenediamine is the main supplement to livestock feed.

Salt is an effective vehicle for distributing iodine to the public because it does not spoil and is consumed in more predictable amounts than most other commodities.  For example, the concentration of iodine in salt has gradually increased p Switzerland: 3.75 mg/kg in 1952, 7.5 mg/kg in 1962, 15 mg/kg in 1980, 20 mg/kg in 1998, and 25 mg/kg in 2014.  These increases were found to improve iodine status in the general Swiss population.

Salt that is iodized may slowly lose its iodine content by exposure to excess air over long periods.

Production
Edible salt can be iodised by spraying it with a potassium iodate or potassium iodide solution. 57 grams of potassium iodate, costing about US$1.15 (in 2006), is required to iodise a ton (2,000 pounds) of salt. Dextrose is added as a stabilizer to prevent potassium iodide from oxidizing and evaporating. Anti-caking agents such as calcium silicate are commonly added to table salt to prevent clumping.

In public health initiatives

Worldwide, iodine deficiency affects two billion people and is the leading preventable cause of intellectual and developmental disabilities. According to public health experts, iodisation of salt may be the world's simplest and most cost-effective measure available to improve health, only costing US$0.05 per person per year. At the World Summit for Children in
1990, a goal was set to eliminate iodine deficiency by 2000. At that time, 25% of households consumed iodised salt, a proportion that increased to 66% by 2006.

Salt producers are often, although not always, supportive of government initiatives to iodize edible salt supplies. Opposition to iodization comes from small salt producers who are concerned about the added expense, private makers of iodine pills, concerns about promoting salt intake, and unfounded rumors that iodization causes AIDS or other illnesses.

The United States Food and Drug Administration recommends 150 micrograms (0.15 mg) of iodine per day for adults.

Argentina 
Since 8 May 1967 salt for human or animal use must be iodised, according to the Law 17,259.

Syria 
In the end of eighties of last century, a Syrian endocrinologist Samir Ouaess conducted a research on hypothyroidism and noticed that 90 percent of Syrians suffer from hypothyroidism, 50 percent suffer from health problems as a result of Thyroid deficiency, and 10 percent of students suffer from a decline in their academic level due to that problem. Dr. Ouaess linked these results with the fact that natural drinking water sources in Syria do not contain enough minerals. He presented the result of that study to the Syrian Ministry of Health. After that, adding iodine to salt became almost mandatory till 2021, when the Syrian government canceled the iodization of salt and as a result of economic problems related to economic sanctions.

Australia 
Australian children were identified as being iodine deficient in a survey conducted between 2003 and 2004. As a result of this study the Australian Government mandated that all bread with the exception of "organic" bread must use iodised salt. There remains concern that this initiative is not sufficient for pregnant and lactating women.

Brazil
Iodine Deficiency Disorders were detected as a major public health issue by Brazilian authorities in the 1950s when about 20% of the population had a goitre.  The National Agency for Sanitary Vigilance (ANVISA) is responsible for setting the mandatory iodine content of table salt.  The Brazilian diet averages 12 g of table salt per day, more than twice the recommended value of 5 g a day.  To avoid excess consumption of iodine, the iodizing of Brazilian table salt was reduced to 15–45  mg/kg in July 2013. Specialists criticized the move, saying that it would be better for the government to promote reduced salt intake, which would solve the iodine problem as well as reduce the incidence of high blood pressure.

Canada
Salt sold to consumers in Canada for table and household use must be iodized with 0.01% potassium iodide. Sea salt and salt sold for other purposes, such as pickling, may be sold uniodized.

China
Much of the Chinese population lives inland, far from sources of dietary iodine. In 1996, the Chinese Ministry of Public Health estimated that iodine deficiency was responsible for 10 million cases of intellectual developmental disorders in China.  Chinese governments have held a legal monopoly on salt production since 119 BCE and began iodizing salt in the 1960s, but market reforms in the 1980s led to widespread smuggling of non-iodized salt from private producers.  In the inland province of Ningxia, only 20% of salt consumed was sold by the China National Salt Industry Corporation.  The Chinese government responded by cracking down on smuggled salt, establishing salt police with 25,000 officers to enforce the salt monopoly.  Consumption of iodized salt reached 90% of the Chinese population by 2000.

India
India and all of its states ban the sale of non-iodized salt for human consumption. However, implementation and enforcement of this policy are imperfect; a 2009 survey found that 9% of households used non-iodized salt and that another 20% used insufficiently iodized salt.

Iodised salt was introduced to India in the late 1950s. Public awareness was increased by special programs and initiatives, both governmental and nongovernmental. As of now, iodine deficiency is only present in a few isolated regions which are still unreachable. In India, some people use Himalayan rock salt. Rock salt however is low in iodine and should be consumed only when there are other iodine-rich foods in diet.

Iran
A national program with iodized salt started in 1992. A national survey of 1990 revealed the prevalence of iodine deficiency to be 20-80% in different parts of Iran indicating a major public health problem. Central provinces, far from the sea, had the highest prevalence of iodine deficiency. The national salt enrichment program had a great rapid success. Prevalence of goiter in Iran dropped dramatically. The national survey in 1996 reported 40% of boys and 50% of girls have goiter. The 3rd national survey in 2001 showed that the total goiter rate is 9.8%. In 2007, the 4th national survey was conducted 17 years after iodized salt consumption by Iranian households. In this study the total goiter rate was 5.7%.</ref>

Concerns of iodine deficiency have raised over recent years due to consumption of non-iodized salts especially sea salt which is strongly suggested by traditional medicine workers in Iran. Many of whom have not any academic studies.

Kazakhstan
Kazakhstan, a country in Central Eurasia in which local food supplies seldom contain sufficient iodine, has drastically reduced iodine deficiency through salt iodization programs. Campaigns by the government and non-profit organizations to educate the public about the benefits of iodized salt began in the mid-1990s, with iodization of edible salt becoming legally mandatory in 2002.

Nepal 
The Salt Trading Corporation has been distributing Iodized Salt in Nepal since 1963. 98% of the Population uses Iodized Salt. Utilising non-Iodised salt for human consumption is prohibited. Salt costs about US$0.27 a Kilo.

Philippines
On December 20, 1995, Philippine President Fidel V. Ramos signed Republic Act 8172: An Act for Salt Iodization Nationwide (ASIN).

Romania
According to the 568/2002 law signed by the Romanian parliament and republished in 2009, since 2002 iodized salt is distributed mandatory in the whole country. It is used mandatory on the market for household consumption, in bakeries, and for pregnant women. Iodised salt is optional though for animal consumption and the food industry, although widely used. The salt iodization process has to assure a minimum of 30mg iodine/kg of salt.

South Africa
The South African government instructed that all salt for sale was to be iodised after December 12, 1995.

United States
Iodized salt is not mandatory in the US but it is widely available.

In the U.S. in the early 20th century, goitres were especially prevalent in the region around the Great Lakes and the Pacific Northwest. David Murray Cowie, a professor of paediatrics at the University of Michigan, led the U.S. to adopt the Swiss practice of adding sodium iodide or potassium iodide to table and cooking salt. On May 1, 1924, iodised salt was sold commercially in Michigan.  By the fall of 1924, Morton Salt Company began distributing iodised salt nationally.

A 2017 study found that the introduction of iodized salt in 1924 raised the IQ for the one-quarter of the population most deficient in iodine. These findings "can explain roughly one decade's worth of the upward trend in IQ in the United States (the Flynn effect)". The study also found "a large increase in thyroid-related deaths following the countrywide adoption of iodized salt, which affected mostly older individuals in localities with high prevalence of iodine deficiency".  A 2013 study found a gradual increase in average intelligence of 1 standard deviation, 15 points in iodine-deficient areas and 3.5 points nationally after the introduction of iodized salt.

A 2018 paper found that the nationwide distribution of iodine-fortified salt increased incomes by 11%, labor force participation by 0.68 percentage points and full-time work by 0.9 percentage points. According to the study, "These impacts were largely driven by changes in the economic outcomes of young women. In later adulthood, both men and women had higher family incomes due to iodization."

No-additive salts for canning and pickling
In contrast to table salt, which often contains iodide as well as anti-caking ingredients, special canning and pickling salt is made for producing the brine to be used in pickling vegetables and other foodstuffs. Contrary to popular belief, however, iodized salt affects neither color, taste, nor consistency of pickles.

Fortification of salt with other elements

Double-fortified salt (DFS)
Salt can also be double-fortified with iron and iodine.  The iron is microencapsulated with stearin to prevent it from reacting with the iodine in the salt. By providing iron in addition to iodine in the convenient delivery vehicle of salt, it could serve as a sustainable approach to combating both iodine and iron deficiency disorders in areas where both deficiencies are prevalent.

Adding iron to iodized salt is complicated by several chemical, technical, and organoleptic issues. Since a viable DFS premix became available for scale-up in 2001, a body of scientific literature has been emerging to support the DFS initiative including studies conducted in Ghana, India, Côte d'Ivoire, Kenya and Morocco.

Fluoridated salt
In some countries, table salt is treated with potassium fluoride to enhance dental health.

Diethylcarbamazine
In India and China, diethylcarbamazine has been added to salt to combat lymphatic filariasis.

See also 
 Basil Hetzel
 Enriched flour serves an analogous function to "enriched salt".
 History of salt
 Lugol's iodine
 Sea salt
 Water fluoridation, a similar public health intervention
 Food fortification

Notes

References

 
 21 CFR 101.9 (c)(8)(iv)
 Newton County – Encyclopedia of Arkansas

External links 
 Iodine intake as a risk factor for thyroid cancer: a comprehensive review of animal and human studies

Edible salt
Salt
History of salt
Endocrinology